Dmitry Borisovich Apanasenko (born 17 July 1967 in Usolye-Sibirskoye) is a Russian former water polo player who competed in the 1988 Summer Olympics, and in the 1992 Summer Olympics.

See also
 Russia men's Olympic water polo team records and statistics
 List of Olympic medalists in water polo (men)
 List of men's Olympic water polo tournament top goalscorers
 List of World Aquatics Championships medalists in water polo

External links
 

1967 births
Living people
People from Usolye-Sibirskoye
Soviet male water polo players
Russian male water polo players
Olympic water polo players of the Soviet Union
Olympic water polo players of the Unified Team
Olympic water polo players of Russia
Water polo players at the 1988 Summer Olympics
Water polo players at the 1992 Summer Olympics
Water polo players at the 1996 Summer Olympics
Olympic bronze medalists for the Soviet Union
Olympic bronze medalists for the Unified Team
Olympic medalists in water polo
Medalists at the 1992 Summer Olympics
Medalists at the 1988 Summer Olympics
Panathinaikos Water Polo Club players
Sportspeople from Irkutsk Oblast